Antonia Xenia Tout (born 2 July 1986) is a Romanian former professional tennis player.

Tout, who comes from the city of Satu Mare, is the daughter of Romanian footballer Anton, who played for local club Olimpia.

Most successful in doubles, Tout won nine ITF doubles titles and featured in her only WTA Tour main draw at the 2008 Budapest Grand Prix, partnering Nataša Zorić.

ITF finals

Singles (0–2)

Doubles (9–10)

References

External links
 
 

1986 births
Living people
Romanian female tennis players
Sportspeople from Satu Mare